The Athletic Ground, also known as Aberdare Stadium and the Ynys Stadium, was a mixed sports venue in Aberdare, Wales, which was predominantly used for football. It was the home of Aberdare Athletic, who were members of the English Football League between 1921 and 1927. For a single season (1908–1909) it was the home of short-lived pioneer rugby league team, Aberdare.

History
The ground was opened in 1893 as the home of Aberdare Town, who later became Aberdare Athletic. On 1 January 1908 the Athletic Ground the venue of the first rugby league international involving a team from outside the British Isles when Wales played New Zealand as part of the 1907–08 tour, with Wales winning 9–8. The match attracted approximately 15,000 fans

By 1920 the ground was still quite basic, with a narrow grandstand on the southern touchline and a cycle track around the pitch. With Aberdare attempting to gain entry to the Football League, the stand was rebuilt, the cycle track removed, and banking installed at each end of the pitch. The following year saw the ground's record attendance of 22,584 set for a schoolboy international between Wales and England on 14 May. In the same year Aberdare were elected to the Football League, and the first League match was played at the ground on 27 August 1921, with Aberdare and Portsmouth drawing 0–0 in front of 9,722 spectators. In 1927 Aberdare were voted out of the Football League.

Greyhound racing
The greyhound racing at Ynys Stadium started on Boxing Day 1932. 
The stadium was east of Aberdare, south of the Cwmbach Road and directly south of the railway track. 
The stadium was independent (unaffiliated to a governing body) and the exact date that the greyhound racing ended is unknown but it was still active in 1950 after being included in the betting licence lists.

References

Aberdare Athletic F.C.
Defunct football venues in Wales
Defunct rugby league venues in Wales
Sports venues completed in 1893
1893 establishments in Wales
English Football League venues
Aberdare
Defunct greyhound racing venues in the United Kingdom
Greyhound racing in Wales